The following is a list of public housing estates in Fanling Town, Hong Kong, including Home Ownership Scheme (HOS), Private Sector Participation Scheme (PSPS), Sandwich Class Housing Scheme (SCHS), Flat-for-Sale Scheme (FFSS), and Tenants Purchase Scheme (TPS) estates.

Overview

Estates

Cheong Shing Court

Cheong Shing Court is an HOS housing estate in Fanling Town, near Wah Ming Estate and Yung Shing Court. It has 3 blocks built in 2000.

Cheung Wah Estate

Cheung Wah Estate is a TPS estate, and the first public estate in Fanling Town. It has 10 residential blocks completed from 1984 to 1986. Some of the flats were sold to tenants through Tenants Purchase Scheme Phase 6A in 2004. A secondary school, Tung Wah Group of Hospitals Li Ka Shing College, is located in the estate.

Fai Ming Estate

Fai Ming Estate, former name "Fanling Area 49", is a public housing estate in Fai Ming Road, Fanling, next to Yung Shing Court. It comprises two blocks with totally 952 flats which completed in 2019.

During COVID-19 pandemic, the Hong Kong Government planned to turn Fai Ming Estate into a place to quarantine and observe people who have been in close contact with confirmed cases. This caused protests by residents of neighbour estates.

Ka Fuk Estate

Ka Fuk Estate is located near Fanling Highway. It consists of 3 residential buildings built in 1994.

Ka Shing Court

Ka Shing Court is an HOS housing estate in Fanling Town, near Ka Fuk Estate. It has 4 blocks built in 1995.

King Shing Court

King Shing Court is an HOS housing estate in Fanling Town, near Wah Sum Estate. It has totally 4 blocks built in 1995.

Queen's Hill Estate and Shan Lai Court

Queen's Hill Estate and Shan Lai Court are a public housing estate and a Home Ownership Scheme court respectively in Kwan Tei, Fanling, North District. Formerly Queen's Hill Camp for British Forces Overseas Hong Kong, the site was originally planned for a private university, but later declined by secondary school graduates.

The site occupies about 13.65 hectares and comprises seven Public Rental Housing (PRH) blocks (i.e. Queen's Hill Estate) and six Subsidised Sale Flats (SSF) blocks (i.e. Shan Lai Court), with the provision of retail facilities, car parks, community and social welfare facilities, educational facilities, bus terminus and ancillary transport facilities. It will provide in stages a total of 8 865 PRH flats and 3 222 SSF flats for a population of 34,500 people. All construction works are expected to complete in 2021.

Wah Ming Estate

Wah Ming Estate (華明邨) is located in Wo Hop Shek. They were sold in the TPS of Hong Kong Housing Authority in March 1993.

Wah Sum Estate

Wah Sum Estate is situated in Wo Hop Shek consisting of 2 residential buildings built in 1995.

Wing Fai Centre

Wing Fai Centre is a PSPS housing estate in Luen Wo Hui, Fanling Town, next to Wing Fok Centre. It has totally 4 blocks built in 1996.

Wing Fok Centre

Wing Fok Centre is a PSPS housing estate in Luen Wo Hui, Fanling Town. It has totally 6 blocks built in 1994.

Yan Shing Court

Yan Shing Court is an HOS housing estate in Fanling Town, near Flora Plaza, King Shing Court. It has totally 7 blocks built in 1993.

Yung Shing Court

Yung Shing Court is an HOS housing estate consisting of three residential buildings completed in 2000. Yung Sui House and Yung Wui House are for rental while Yung Wa House is for Buy or Rent Option.

See also
 Public housing in Hong Kong
 List of public housing estates in Hong Kong

References

Fanling